The Eusébio Cup is a pre-season friendly football match hosted by Portuguese club S.L. Benfica since 2008. It has been played mostly at their home stadium, Estádio da Luz, with the two exceptions being the 2015 and 2018 editions (played at Estadio BBVA and Estádio Algarve, respectively). The two-team competition is named after Portuguese international and former Benfica player Eusébio, who presented the trophy to the winning team until 2013, before his death in January 2014. There were plans to extend the number of participants to four, a move that Eusébio himself was in favor of, but no changes were ever made in that regard.

The cup's first edition was won by Inter Milan, with the other winners being Benfica (2009, 2011, 2012, 2022), Tottenham (2010), São Paulo (2013), Ajax (2014), Monterrey (2015), Torino (2016) – in a match that also served to honour the memory of the Grande Torino team who died in the Superga air disaster – and Lyon (2018). No invited team, also including runners-up AC Milan, Arsenal, Real Madrid and Newcastle United, has participated in more than one edition.

The invitational match has been played in late July and early August, and it was played annually and without interruption until 2016. Despite two tries, there was no edition in 2017. A year later, the Eusébio Cup returned as part of the 2018 International Champions Cup, only to be revived four years later in Lisbon.

Trophy
The Eusébio Cup trophy is made out of glass and bears the name of the match and its winners. Moreover, it features a figure of Eusébio, on the top, performing his trademark shooting technique. The figure is similar to Eusébio's statue outside Estádio da Luz. The trophy is symbolic because it is dedicated to Eusébio, who is considered one of the greatest footballers of all time, and Benfica's greatest.

Broadcasters
The following is a list of television channels who broadcast the matches for Portugal.

Matches

2008

2009

2010

2011

2012

2013

2014

2015

2016

2017

2018

2022

Performance by team

References

Portuguese football friendly trophies
S.L. Benfica
2008 establishments in Portugal
Recurring sporting events established in 2008